François Ozon (born 15 November 1967) is a French film director and screenwriter.

Ozon is considered one of the most important modern French filmmakers. His films are characterized by aesthetic beauty, sharp satirical humor and a free-wheeling view of human sexuality. Recurring themes in his films are friendship, sexual identity, different perceptions of reality, transience and death.

Ozon has achieved international acclaim for his films 8 femmes (2002) and Swimming Pool (2003). He is considered one of the most important directors in the new "New Wave" in French cinema, along with Jean-Paul Civeyrac, Philippe Ramos, and Yves Caumon, as well as a group of French filmmakers associated with a cinema du corps ("cinema of the body").

Life and career 
Ozon was born in Paris, France. Having studied directing at the French film school La Femis, Ozon made several short films such as A Summer Dress (Une robe d'été, 1996) and Scènes de lit (1998). His motion picture directing debut was Sitcom (also 1998), which was well received by both critics and audiences.

After the Fassbinder adaptation Water Drops on Burning Rocks (Gouttes d'eau sur pierres brûlantes, 2000) came the film which made his name outside France, 8 Women (8 femmes, 2002), starring Catherine Deneuve, Fanny Ardant, Isabelle Huppert and Emmanuelle Béart. With its quirky mix of musical numbers and murder mystery and a production design harking back to 1950s Hollywood melodramas such as those directed by Douglas Sirk, the film became a huge commercial success.

In 2003, Swimming Pool, starring Charlotte Rampling and Ludivine Sagnier, was released. Ozon considered it a very personal film that gives insight into the difficult process of writing a novel or screenplay.

In 2004 he directed the film 5x2. In 2005 his film Time to Leave (Le temps qui reste) was screened at film festivals worldwide.

Ozon's first full English-language production, Angel, starring Romola Garai, was released in 2007. The film, based on a novel by British writer Elizabeth Taylor, follows the story of a poor girl who climbs Edwardian England's social ladder by becoming a romance writer. The film was shot at Tyntesfield House and Estate near Bristol, at other UK locations and in Belgium.

While filming Angel, Ozon developed a strong friendship with Garai and called her his "muse".

His film The Refuge had its world premiere at the Toronto International Film Festival in September 2009.

Ozon was on the jury for the 62nd Berlin International Film Festival, held in February 2012.

His 2013 film Young & Beautiful (Jeune & Jolie) was nominated for the Palme d'Or at the 2013 Cannes Film Festival. Ozon was voted best screenwriter at the 2013 European Film Awards for his 2012 film In the House.

His 2014 film The New Girlfriend premiered at the Toronto International Film Festival in September 2014.

His film Peter von Kant, a gender-flipped reinterpretation of Rainer Werner Fassbinder's 1972 film The Bitter Tears of Petra von Kant, premiered at the 2022 Berlin Film Festival.

Awards 
 1999: Seattle International Film Festival - Emerging Masters Showcase Award
 2004: Filmfest Hamburg - Douglas-Sirk-Award
 2006: Frameline Film Festival - Frameline Award
 2011: Jameson Dublin International Film Festival - Career Achievement Award

Filmography

Awards and nominations

References

Further reading
Asibong, Andrew, François Ozon, Manchester University Press (2008) 
Badt, Karin,  "Francois Ozon's New Thriller Gains Applause at Cannes Despite Shallowness," Huffington Post (2017).   http://www.huffingtonpost.com/entry/592736c8e4b03296e2d11342
Cavitch, Max, "Sex After Death: François Ozon's Libidinal Invasions," Screen 48.3 (2007), 313-26
 Padva, Gilad. "Undressed Masculinities and Disrupted Sexualities in Une Robe d'été" in Grandena, Florian and Johnston, Cristina (Eds.). Cinematic Queerness: Gay and Lesbian Hypervisibility in Contemporary Francophone Feature Films, vol. 2 (Modern French Identities 98) (pp. 215–225). Oxford and New York: Peter Lang (2011).
Palmer, Tim, "Style and Sensation in the Contemporary French Cinema of the Body," Journal of Film and Video 58.3 (2006), 22-32
 Rees-Roberts, Nick. French Queer Cinema, Edinburgh University Press (2008) 
 Schilt, Thibaut. François Ozon, University of Illinois Press (2011) 
 Wende, Johannes (Ed.), François Ozon, edition text + kritik (2016)

External links

François Ozon's official site 
Senses of Cinema: Great Directors Critical Database
Summer 2006 Interview with Ozon
  POTICHE Facebook Page

1967 births
Living people
Best Director Lumières Award winners
European Film Award for Best Screenwriter winners
Film directors from Paris
French film editors
French film producers
French male non-fiction writers
French male screenwriters
French screenwriters
French-language film directors
German-language film directors
French gay writers
LGBT film directors
French LGBT screenwriters
Officers Crosses of the Order of Merit of the Federal Republic of Germany
Officiers of the Ordre des Arts et des Lettres